Jeremiah Norman Williams (May 29, 1829 – May 8, 1915) was a two-term Democratic U.S. Representative from Alabama.  His election marked the return of Democratic control of the Alabama's 2nd congressional district, after Republican control during the earlier years of Reconstruction.

Biography
Williams was born May 29, 1829 near Louisville, Alabama, to Judge Stith and Euphemia Williams. After attending the preparatory schools of Barbour County, he graduated from the University of South Carolina at Columbia in 1852.

He studied law in Montgomery and Tuskegee and was admitted to the bar in 1855.  He commenced practice in Clayton, Alabama.

Civil War service
When the American Civil War broke out he volunteered for service in the Confederate States Army and was made captain of the Clayton Guards. He then became a major of the First Regiment, Alabama Infantry, before resigning due to illness. During the war he married Mary Eliza Screws. They had five children together.

Postbellum
After the war Williams was elected a member of the Alabama House of Representatives in 1872, but was not allowed to take his seat. In 1874 he was elected as a Democrat to represent Alabama's 2nd congressional district in the 44th United States Congress.  After redistricting, he won a second term representing Alabama's 3rd congressional district in the 45th United States Congress.  Williams served as chairman of the Committee on Expenditures in the Post Office Department in the Forty-fifth Congress. He served two full terms, from March 4, 1875 to March 3, 1879.

After leaving office he resumed his law practice in Clayton.  He served as Chancellor of the third division of the chancery court from 1893 to 1899. In 1901 he served as member of the Alabama Constitutional Convention.

He died in Clayton on May 8, 1915, and was interred in the City Cemetery.

References
 Retrieved on 2009-04-20

1829 births
1915 deaths
People from Louisville, Alabama
Alabama lawyers
Confederate States Army officers
Democratic Party members of the United States House of Representatives from Alabama
Alabama state court judges
19th-century American politicians
University of South Carolina alumni
19th-century American judges
19th-century American lawyers